John Szczerbanik (born 20 March 1957) is a former Australian politician.

He was born in Liverpool, Sydney, and worked as a registered nurse before entering politics. He was elected to the Queensland Legislative Assembly in 1989 as the Labor member for Albert, and he served as a backbencher until his defeat by National Party candidate Bill Baumann in 1995.

References

1957 births
Living people
Politicians from Sydney
Members of the Queensland Legislative Assembly
Australian nurses
Australian people of Polish descent
Australian Labor Party members of the Parliament of Queensland